Village swing is a large swing designed for multiple adults, traditionally built on village communal land, in Estonia and Finland.

History 
The practice of swinging has been with Estonian culture for a long time, its origin is not known. The prevalence of village swings was noted by Estophile August Wilhelm Hupel in 1781, stating "swings can be seen near almost every tavern and small village, often individual farms".

In recent times, authorities have begun considering village swings to be a safety hazard. In 2013 the town government of Saue decided not to repair their swing because no companies were willing to accept liability in the event of damage.

Kiiking 

The sport kiiking was invented in Estonia in 1993, where people compete for performing a full 360 rotation with a swing. The construction of kiiking swings is radically different from village swings, but shares the cultural underpinnings.

References

External links 

 Known locations of village swings on OpenStreetMap

Estonian culture
Finnish culture
Playground equipment